Mercy University Hospital (MUH) is a general hospital located in Cork, Ireland. It is managed by South/Southwest Hospital Group.

History 
The hospital was established by the Sisters of Mercy on 17 March 1857. However, the oldest part of the building dates back to the 1760s, as the residence of the Mayor of Cork, and was temporarily used as a school before being converted into a hospital. Mercy University Hospital originally contained only 40-beds, but has since grown to its current number of over 300.

References

External links 

Hospitals in County Cork
Buildings and structures in Cork (city)
Hospital buildings completed in 1857
1857 establishments in Ireland
Hospitals established in 1857
19th-century architecture in the Republic of Ireland